Polity Agent is a 2006 science fiction novel by Neal Asher.  It is the fourth novel in the Gridlinked sequence.

Plot

From 800 years in the future, a runcible gate is opened into the Polity. Those coming through it have been tasked with taking the alien 'Maker' back to its home civilization in the Small Magellanic cloud. Once these refugees are safely through, the gate itself is rapidly shut down because something alien is pursuing them. From those who get through, agent Cormac learns that the Maker civilization has been destroyed by pernicious virus known as the Jain technology. This raises questions: Why was Dragon, a massive bioconstruct of the Makers, really sent to the Polity; why did a Jain node suddenly end up in the hands of someone who could do the most damage with it? Meanwhile, an entity called the Legate is distributing toxic Jain nodes ...and a renegade attack ship, The King of Hearts, has encountered something very nasty outside the Polity itself ...

External links

Review

2006 American novels
American science fiction novels
Small Magellanic Cloud in fiction
Tor Books books